openSAP is an Enterprise MOOC platform for massive open online courses, or MOOCs. It is provided by SAP and hosted at the Hasso Plattner Institute in Potsdam, Germany. Everyone can enroll in openSAP courses, which are provided free of charge.

While the MOOC concept is already quite popular in academia, SAP is one of the first companies to build a platform dedicated to MOOCs and adopt it for business-related training purposes. Compared to traditional e-learning formats, openSAP courses return to tried and trusted classroom concepts and transfer them to an online medium in the following way:

 Courses have a defined duration (typically six weeks) to which students need to adhere
 Courses are based on lectures (delivery through video), supporting material (slide decks, handouts), and self-tests.
 Students need to submit homework on a weekly basis and adhere to deadlines. The homework is graded and contributes to the points required to receive a record of achievement.
 Students can discuss the course content in an online forum.
 Courses end with a final exam.
 Some courses include peer assessments where learners can submit their work for review by their peers and content experts. This helps the learner to develop their ideas with feedback - just like in a classroom setting.

The average duration of the video lectures is 90 minutes per week. Combined with additional self-study and homework, the average effort required to complete an openSAP course successfully is four to six hours per week. This makes it easy for students to combine courses with their other responsibilities.

The first openSAP course
The first openSAP course was held from May 27 through July 15, 2013.

 18,033 learners were enrolled on day 1 of the course.
 When the final exam ended, this number had increased to 40,386.
 15,748 learners actively participated in the course.
 10,795 learners took the final exam.
 9,383 graded records of achievement were distributed.

Peer Assessment
Peer assessment features as an element in many openSAP courses around design and development. In 2016, openSAP saw 2,100 learners submit prototypes, built on SAP Splash and Build, as part of one of its courses.

Awards
February 2014:"Innovation in Learning Bronze Award 2014" at The Learning Awards 2014, hosted by the Learning and Performance Institute.
September 2014:"" in the category, "Best in Extended Enterprise Learning Program"
May 2015, Best Innovative Corporate University by the Global Council of Corporate Universities
June 2016, Excellent Place in the Land of Ideas awarded by Germany – Land of Ideas 
October 2017, TSIA Star Award: Innovation in Execution of Education Services – Gold by the Technical Services Industry Association

Current users
In January 2018, there were 600,000 unique users on the openSAP platform with over 2.3 million course enrollments.

See also
 MOOC

References

German educational websites
SAP SE